Tropical Storm Felice was a modest tropical cyclone that lightly affected parts of the Gulf Coast of the United States in mid-September 1970. Spawned by an upper-level trough over the Bahamas, the system crossed the Florida Keys and entered the Gulf of Mexico, where it gradually began to strengthen. Felice was a disorganized storm for its entire duration, plagued by dry air, a lack of deep thunderstorm activity, and an ill-defined center of circulation, but nevertheless managed to peak as a high-end tropical storm with winds just below Category 1 hurricane strength. Tracking northwestward, the storm brushed southern Louisiana on September 15 before making landfall northeast of Galveston, Texas, late that same day. Once ashore, Felice quickly deteriorated as it recurved into the central United States. While over southeastern Oklahoma, however, its remnants still closely resembled a formidable tropical cyclone.

In advance of the cyclone, officials prompted residents in vulnerable communities to leave their homes, and temporary storm shelters were established. However, the effects from Felice were generally light. Beneficial rains fell over parts of southern Florida, while sections of coastal Louisiana experienced minimal gale-force winds and above-normal tides. Felice delayed the local rice harvest and damaged some hay that had been cut before the storm. Significant precipitation and gusty winds accompanied the system into northern Texas and Oklahoma. Overall, the storm left no fatalities or widespread property damage anywhere along its path.

Meteorological history

Developing as a tropical depression near Nassau in the Bahamas on September 12, Felice had its origins in a persistent upper-level trough over the area. The nascent depression tracked slowly toward the west-southwest without much intensification, ultimately passing just north of Key West, Florida as it entered the Gulf of Mexico. Over the open waters of the Gulf, the system accelerated toward the west-northwest along the southern periphery of a large ridge of high pressure to the north. While reconnaissance aircraft data on the storm suggested that the depression strengthened into a tropical storm midday on September 14, the official Atlantic tropical cyclone database known as HURDAT indicates the disturbance attained tropical storm status at 0000 UTC on September 15.

The storm's center came within range of the weather radar site at New Orleans, Louisiana, resulting in close observation of the storm's progress. Felice suffered from restricted outflow and a nebulous circulation, marked by the appearance of two centers. Near daybreak on September 15, a more distinct center had apparently formed  to the west-northwest of the storm's initial core, which reportedly dissipated. Operationally, forecasters at the National Hurricane Center believed a surge of southerly inflow transported a significant amount of atmospheric vorticity away from the old center of low pressure, allowing for a new surface-based circulation to form. Indeed, a special off-hour advisory was issued to identify the storm's new location. However, post-season analysis of Felice determined that due to the cyclone's disheveled nature, as well as technical problems at the time of observation, the center relocation could not be conclusively proven; as a result, the official storm path does not reflect any significant jogs.

Felice moved nearly parallel to the southern coast of Louisiana as it began to show signs of improved structure. Dry continental air from the north likely prevented Felice from reaching Category 1 hurricane strength. Even as a strong tropical storm, Felice lacked deep convection typical of mature tropical cyclones. The storm rapidly deteriorated once over land and slowed in forward speed. Curving toward the northwest, Felice passed near Houston and weakened into a tropical depression. The diminishing system turned northward through north-central Texas late on September 16 and entered southeastern Oklahoma by September 17.

Although Felice officially dissipated as a tropical cyclone at 1200 UTC on September 17, its remnants exhibited a structure very similar to that of a healthy tropical cyclone, as depicted by radar imagery from the National Severe Storms Laboratory in Norman. Two aircraft flew into the area to collect data on the unique storm; notably, they discovered that the system retained a deep warm core relative to its environment. Throughout the day on September 17, the remnants of Felice continued to weaken. The residual surface low recurved toward the east-northeast over Oklahoma and Arkansas before fully dissipating after September 19.

Preparations and impact
As Felice neared the coast, gale warnings were hoisted from Morgan City, Louisiana, to Galveston, while a hurricane watch extended from Morgan City to Port O'Connor, Texas. Small craft advisories were also posted, cautioning light vessels to remain in port. All coastal advisories were discontinued by the early hours of September 16. Residents in the path of the storm generally evacuated in a timely manner. Over 3,000 fled the storm in Cameron Parish, Louisiana; around half of the residents in the low-lying southern part of the parish had already left before the mandatory evacuation was ordered. Farther west, one of two evacuation routes out of Sabine Pass, Texas, had been rendered unusable a few days before the storm when a bridge was damaged in a maritime accident. As the remaining highway was considered susceptible to coastal flooding, officials quickly worked to evacuate 1,300 people in Sabine Pass before the storm's approach. The American Red Cross converted nine public schools into temporary storm shelters in and around Beaumont. Shelters were also set up in Houston and Baton Rouge, Louisiana, though they went mostly unused. The post offices in Sabine Pass, Gilchrist, and Port Bolivar transferred money orders, first-class parcels and postage stamps to the Beaumont office as a safety precaution.

While crossing the Florida Keys on September 13, the depression dropped modest but beneficial rainfall of around 1 to 3 in (25 to 75 mm) over the southern Florida Peninsula. Rainfall in Louisiana was light, peaking near 2.5 in (65 mm) in areas closest to the storm's path. Though the winds may have affected the quality of sugar cane crops in extreme southern areas of the state, no flooding or property damage was reported.

The storm's landfall was accompanied by significant rainfall, gusty winds, and heightened tides. At Crystal Beach, near where Felice crossed the coast, a distinct lull in the wind and rain coincided with the passage of the storm's poorly defined eye. The storm uprooted some newly planted palm trees, one of which landed on a parked car. Isolated power outages affected parts of the area, including the east side of Galveston after a transformer was hit by lightning. Elsewhere, Felice brought down numerous tree limbs and power lines.

The precipitation resulted in a few instances of inconsequential flooding, but more commonly proved beneficial as it helped to relieve dry conditions throughout eastern Texas. Rice and hay crops sustained minor damage, with the harvest of the former delayed by about a week. As the weakening storm progressed inland, it continued to drop heavy rainfall. Over  of rain fell over Denton County in northern Texas. The system continued to generate showers and thunderstorms over the central Mississippi River Valley, producing a swath of 3 inch or greater rainfall totals across northern Arkansas.

See also

List of Texas hurricanes
Tropical Storm Danielle (1980) – weak tropical storm that brought widespread rainfall to portions of Texas and Louisiana
Hurricane Barry (1983) – crossed the Florida peninsula before striking the border between Texas and Mexico, causing minimal damage
Tropical Storm Edouard (2008) – strong, albeit short-lived, tropical storm that brought rainfall to east Texas
Tropical Storm Erin (2007) - Another Tropical system that became unusually organized over Oklahoma.

References

Felice 1970
Felice
1970 natural disasters in the United States
Felice 1970
Felice 1970
Felice
1970 in Florida